The Vicar of Wakefield is a 1913 British silent historical drama film directed by Frank Wilson and starring Violet Hopson, Harry Royston and Chrissie White. The film is an adaptation of the 1766 novel The Vicar of Wakefield by the Irish writer Oliver Goldsmith.

Cast
 Violet Hopson as Olivia Primrose 
 Harry Royston as Richard Thornhill 
 Warwick Buckland as Dr Charles Primrose  
 Chrissie White as Sophia Primrose  
 Harry Gilbey as Sir William Thornhill  
 Marie de Solla as Mrs Primrose  
 Jack Raymond as Moses Primrose  
 Harry Buss as Jenkinson  
 John MacAndrews as Minister

References

Bibliography
 Palmer, Scott. British Film Actors' Credits, 1895-1987. McFarland, 1988.

External links

1913 films
1910s historical drama films
British historical drama films
British silent feature films
1910s English-language films
Films directed by Frank Wilson
Films set in England
Films set in the 18th century
Films based on Irish novels
Hepworth Pictures films
British black-and-white films
1913 drama films
1910s British films
Silent historical drama films